Trent Buhagiar (born 27 February 1998) is an Australian professional footballer who plays for Newcastle Jets in the A-League.

Early life
Born in Gosford, Buhagiar moved to and grew up on the Central Coast of New South Wales, playing junior football for the Umina Eagles. He attended the International Football School at Kariong.

Club career

Central Coast Mariners
Buhagiar signed a professional deal with the Central Coast Mariners in early 2016. He first came into the matchday squad for a game against Melbourne City in February 2016. He scored his maiden goal on 28 December 2016 against Melbourne Victory. On 4 May 2018, Buhagiar left the Central Coast Mariners.

Sydney FC
The week after leaving Central Coast Mariners, Buhagiar joined Sydney FC on 10 May 2018.

International career
Buhagiar was born in Australia and is of Maltese descent. Buhagiar was called up to the Australian under-20 side for a training camp in July 2016.

Career statistics

Honours

Club
Sydney FC
 A-League Championship: 2019–20
 A-League Premiership: 2019–20

References

External links

Living people
1998 births
Association football forwards
Australian soccer players
Australia youth international soccer players
Australian people of Maltese descent
Central Coast Mariners FC players
Central Coast Mariners Academy players
Sydney FC players
A-League Men players
National Premier Leagues players
People from Gosford
Sportsmen from New South Wales
Soccer players from New South Wales